The Semowane River is a major natural watercourse in Southern Africa. Within Botswana the Semowane River forms a boundary between several governmental jurisdictions. This river is a vital source of water to the ephemeral wetlands of the Makgadikgadi, where a number of species of limited distribution thrive. Specifically the Semowane River discharges to Sua Pan.

See also
 Nwetwe Pan

References
 Botswana National Government Constitution: Volume I (2008)
 Ann Hulsmans, Sofie Bracke, Kelle Moreau, Bruce J. Riddoch, Luc De Meester and Luc Brendonck, Dormant egg bank characteristics and hatching pattern of the Phallocryptus spinosa  (Anostraca) population in the Makgadikgadi Pans (Botswana), Hydrobiologia, Springer Netherlands, Volume 571, Number 1 / November, 2006  ISSN 0018-8158 (Print) 1573–5117, pages 123-132

Line notes

Rivers of Botswana
Makgadikgadi Pan